Euphrasia cuneata, or North Island eyebright, is a perennial herb or subshrub in the genus Euphrasia, native to New Zealand. It grows to 60 cm, with woody stems and white flowers with a yellow lower lip. E. cuneata is found primarily in northern New Zealand, from the easternmost point of the North Island, East Cape, to the north-easternmost point of the South Island, the Marlborough Sounds; however, E. cuneata can be found as far south as Lake Ellesmere in Canterbury. It grows from subalpine to coastal areas in "open rocky places, stream-sides and among scrub."

References

cuneata
Flora of New Zealand